Progress is a rural locality (a settlement) in Rubashevskoye Rural Settlement, Anninsky District, Voronezh Oblast, Russia. The population was 125 as of 2010. There are 2 streets.

Geography 
Progress is located 19 km north of Anna (the district's administrative centre) by road. Bolshiye Yasyrki is the nearest rural locality.

References 

Rural localities in Anninsky District